Question Everything is an Australian comedy panel television show hosted by Wil Anderson which first screened on ABC TV first screened 18 August 2021.

The live show features four celebrity panellists, led by Jan Fran. The panel are asked to dissect the news, sort the real from the rumours, separate fact from fiction and flatten conspiracy theories, fake stories, false claims, scams, frauds and outright lies. It also features pre-recorded segments by Jan Fran called "Jan-splaining".

Episodes

Series 1 (2021)

Series 2 (2022)

References

External links
 Question Everything official website

2020s Australian game shows
2021 Australian television series debuts
Australian Broadcasting Corporation original programming
Australian comedy television series
Australian panel games
English-language television shows